Nery Olvin Medina Norales (born 5 August 1981 in Santa Rosa de Aguán, Honduras) is a Honduran footballer who most recently played as right back for F.C. Motagua in the Liga Nacional de Fútbol de Honduras.

Club career
Nicknamed el Flash, Medina started his career at F.C. Motagua with whom he won one league title and also played for Municipal Valencia and Real España, whom he left in June 2010.

Necaxa 
On 8 August 2010, Medina made his debut in the Liga Nacional de Futbol de Honduras for C.D. Necaxa against F.C. Motagua in a 3–0 win. He scored his first goal on 23 January 2011 against Real C.D. España in a 2–1 win. Up to November 2011, he had scored 21 goals in Honduran football.

He rejoined Motagua for the 2012 Apertura season.

International career
Medina made his debut for Honduras in an October 2003 friendly match against Bolivia and has earned a total of 12 caps, scoring no goals. He has represented his country at the 2009 CONCACAF Gold Cup.

His final international was a July 2009 UNCAF Nations Cup match against the USA.

International goals
Scores and results list Honduras's goal tally first.

References

External links 

1981 births
Living people
People from Colón Department (Honduras)
Association football defenders
Honduran footballers
Honduras international footballers
2009 CONCACAF Gold Cup players
2013 CONCACAF Gold Cup players
F.C. Motagua players
Real C.D. España players
Liga Nacional de Fútbol Profesional de Honduras players